The Berkeley Group Holdings plc is a British property developer and house-builder based in Cobham, England. It is listed on the London Stock Exchange and is a constituent of the FTSE 100 Index.

History
The company was founded by Tony Pidgley and Jim Farrer in Weybridge in 1976 as Berkeley Homes, a name borne by regional subsidiaries. Pidgley (the dominant partner) and Farrer had previously run the housing division of Crest Homes and they aimed to focus on executive housing on single plots or small sites. Over the next few years, Berkeley expanded across the home counties, and while building less than 100 houses a year, it floated its shares on the Unlisted Securities Market in 1984.

After the flotation, Berkeley expanded geographically to the west, the south midlands, and East Anglia; it also formed a joint venture, St George, to build in central London. By 1988, Berkeley was building over 600 executive homes a year. By then Pidgley was aware of the overheating in the housing market and sold houses aggressively to realise cash. For two years the company did no more than break even but its cash position was strong and in 1991 it was able to purchase the Manchester-based Crosby Homes and the outstanding 50% of St George; Berkeley began buying large development sites at distressed prices. The 1990s was the decade in which Berkeley moved its operational orientation to major urban regeneration sites in London, Birmingham, Manchester, and other northern cities.

In the early 2000s, Berkeley refined its strategy to concentrate primarily on relatively large scale urban redevelopments in the London area. In 2003 it announced the deferred sale of Crosby Homes. The reduction in scale was intended to generate surplus cash and 2004 saw a scheme of arrangement to return £1.45m to shareholders.

In 2015, the company won Large Developer of the Year at the RESI awards organised by Property Week.

In March 2020, during the COVID-19 pandemic in the United Kingdom, Berkeley said that coronavirus had cost it £80m in just six weeks and began shutting down most of its sites, having earlier cancelled a £455m shareholder payout. In June 2020, the company announced it was consulting on up to 200 redundancies, and revealed its pre-tax profits were down 35% partly due to the COVID-19 impact, with falls in sales and revenues. As a result of the COVID-19 pandemic, the company pushed back payment of £455m to shareholders by two years.

Founder and chairman Tony Pidgley died, after suffering a stroke, in June 2020. Non-executive director Glyn Barker was appointed interim chairman for up to two years until a permanent replacement is identified.

Operations
Berkeley Homes has built some apartment towers in central London, including the One Blackfriars skyscraper (2014). In smaller operations, it runs urban redevelopment programmes via Berkeley Community Villages and constructs in commercial property via Berkeley Commercial. Another subsidiary, Berkeley First, builds student and key worker accommodation. The operational subsidiaries include Berkeley Homes plc, which plans the largest estates and hires contractors with responsibility for the management of communal areas unless and until taken over by residents' Right to Manage companies. The developer imposes covenants to retain value across homes in its neighbourhoods.

Large examples of operations include community facilities with village-sized neighbourhoods which are green-buffered and constructed closes of apartments and houses; for example, a scheme in Bracknell for 750 new homes, a primary school, extra care facility, roads, landscaping and local shops to be constructed on mixed-use land to expand the Warfield suburb, beside the town's computing and headquarters business parks.

In London major developments include Wimbledon Hill Park, Kidbrooke Village and Royal Arsenal Riverside in Woolwich.

Controversies

Flammable cladding
Following the Grenfell Tower fire in 2017, it emerged that many high rise buildings in the UK had been built with flammable cladding and insulation, and that many developers had not installed required fire hazard mitigation measures. Several Berkeley Group's buildings were reported as having been built without the proper fire measures and some of their buildings have caught fire, such as Richmond House (part of the Hamptons development in Worcester Park, southwest London) in 2019 and Holborough Lakes, in Snodland, Kent in 2017.

In the case of Richmond House, Andy Roe, commissioner of the London Fire Brigade (LFB) told a London Assembly committee that the building had been damaged beyond repair "in approximately 11 minutes once the fire had taken hold … entirely due to problems with internal compartmentation and poor standards of construction". Arnold Tarling, a fire safety expert, found similar fire safety problems at other blocks of flats at Berkeley's Hamptons development. “There were large gaps. There was no fire-stopping. And it was packed full of wood fibre...”. LFB's Roe said he uncovered similar defects at other Berkeley developments, including one in Reading and at Holborough Lakes, where the 2017 fire destroyed a block of flats with the same timber-frame construction as Richmond House. Hansen, a solicitor acting for Richmond House residents, stated that rather than paying appropriate compensation to the residents, “Berkeley has since instructed contractual dispute solicitors who are now denying liability and saying, ‘We are not paying anything.’”

Other buildings built by Berkeley were deemed to be such a fire risk that they required immediate evacuation, such as the Paragon estate in Brentford. However, like many UK developers, Berkeley Holdings Group opted not to pay for the required fire safety remediation works for several of its buildings, so leaseholders had to fund it themselves. The cost per flat for installing the required fire safety mitigation measures was reported as amounting to over £100,000 per flat. The government, media and the UK Cladding Action Group called on developers to pay for the remediation works, as some leaseholders had already declared bankruptcy over the fire safety costs. Berkeley Group also rejected a call for an industry wide developer levy to help fund the remediation costs. Sarah Pidgley, wife of Berkeley Homes founder, Tony Pidgley, donated £35,000 to the Conservative Party between 2017 and 2020.

Happy Man Tree dispute 

In 2020, Berkeley Homes was involved in a dispute with environmental campaigners over a 150 year old plane tree, known locally as the Happy Man Tree, which it wants removed as part of regeneration work on Woodberry Down estate in Hackney. Berkeley Homes and Hackney Council sought an injunction against peaceful protesters from blocking the removal of the tree, which was granted.

References

External links

Official website

 
Housebuilding companies of the United Kingdom
Companies based in Surrey
British companies established in 1976
Construction and civil engineering companies established in 1976
1976 establishments in England
Companies listed on the London Stock Exchange